The Jabalpur–Hazrat Nizamuddin Gondwana Express is a Superfast Express train of West Central Railway in India.

This train was discontinued in the Railway 2013–14.

Following is a detailed Gondwana Express train schedule

Defunct trains in India
Rail transport in Madhya Pradesh
Transport in Jabalpur